Ferencvárosi TC II is a Hungarian football club located in Budapest, Hungary. It currently plays in Hungarian National Championship II. The team's colors are white and green.

Current squad
As of 13 October 2020

Out on loan

Honours
 Puskás Cup:
 Winners (1): 2009

External links 
 Official website 
 Soccerway

Football clubs in Hungary
Association football clubs established in 1899